"Little Things" is the first single released by American soul and R&B singer-songwriter India Arie from her second studio album Voyage to India. In 2003, the song won a Grammy award for Best Urban/Alternative Performance; the album also won, giving Arie her first two Grammy wins. Arie wrote the song with Hawk Wolinski, Shannon Sanders, Andre Fischer and Anthony Robertson—all of them musicians associated with the band Rufus. Arie produced the song with Sanders.

Arie began performing the song in her concerts starting in August 2002, before the single was released on September 10, preceding the album release by two weeks. The single entered the Billboard charts in mid-September 2002, and in October it peaked at number 33 on the Hot R&B/Hip-Hop Songs chart, staying on the chart for 33 weeks. It peaked in November at number 89 on the Hot 100 chart. At the end of 2002, Billboard listed the "Little Things" as the 41st most-played song on "Adult R&B" radio stations in the US during 2002.

Arie said that the song was "about the lessons [she] learned last year" when she experienced difficulty balancing her career fame with her personal life. The Washington Post praised the song as a "lilting paean to... life's simple pleasures". The New York Times noticed that "Little Things" and "Slow Down" were the two "songs of self-encouragement" on Voyage to India. The BBC observed that the song was similar to "Hollywood" from the 1977 Rufus album Ask Rufus, writing "the lift is discreet and in the best taste."

Personnel
India Arie – lead and backing vocals, production
Shannon Sanders – keyboards, production
Ricky Quinones – guitar
Khari Simmons – bass
Forrest Robinson – drums
Kerisha Hicks – backing vocals
Tony Harrington – backing vocals
Avery Johnson – recording engineer

Charts

References

2002 singles
2002 songs
India Arie songs
Motown singles
Music videos directed by Sanaa Hamri
Grammy Award for Best Urban/Alternative Performance
Songs written by India Arie
Songs written by Shannon Sanders